Cocañín (variant: Cocaño) is one of five parishes (administrative divisions) in San Martín del Rey Aurelio, a municipality within the province and autonomous community of Asturias, in northern Spain.

Villages
The villages and hamlets include: La Güeria, Los Artos, Brañella, La Cabañina, La Cabañona, El Caleyu, La Casanueva, La Casorra, La Casuca, Ciriego, Cocañín, Cocaño, El Contu, El Contu Baxo, El Contu Medio, La Correoria, El Corvero, La Cotariella, La Encarná, Fatorgá, La Faya, Les Felechoses, La Güerta, L'Hedráu, La Ifrera, La Llonga, El Llanu, La Lloseta, La Malena, Ordiales, Pedroco, Piñera, El Pullíu, La Quemá, El Rebollal, El Rosellón, La Rina, EL Riusgüés, Roíles, La Rotella, La Sagosa, Solallonga, La Vallina, La Vaúba and Ximiniz.

References

Parishes in San Martín del Rey Aurelio